Alexander Thieme (13 January 1954 – 29 November 2016) was an East German athlete, who competed mainly in the 100 metres. Thieme was born in Karl-Marx-Stadt, Saxony. He competed for East Germany in the 1976 Summer Olympics held in Montreal, Quebec, Canada in the 4 × 100 metres relay where he won the silver medal alongside his teammates Manfred Kokot, Jörg Pfeifer and Klaus-Dieter Kurrat. In 1977, his team came in second place in the 4 x 100 m relay at the IAAF World Cup in Düsseldorf.

References

 

1954 births
2016 deaths
Sportspeople from Chemnitz
East German male sprinters
Olympic silver medalists for East Germany
Athletes (track and field) at the 1976 Summer Olympics
Olympic athletes of East Germany
European Athletics Championships medalists
Medalists at the 1976 Summer Olympics
Olympic silver medalists in athletics (track and field)